Archibald Dunn (14 December 1876 – February 1943) was a Scottish professional footballer who played as a wing half.

References

1876 births
1943 deaths
Footballers from Glasgow
Scottish footballers
Association football wing halves
West Bromwich Albion F.C. players
Bristol Rovers F.C. players
Millwall F.C. players
Grimsby Town F.C. players
Wellingborough Town F.C. players
English Football League players
People from Bridgeton, Glasgow